The Price River Formation is a geologic formation in Utah. It preserves fossils dating back to the Cretaceous period.
of cliff-forming sandstone and siltstone visible in the Book Cliffs.

Description

Irregularly bedded light-gray to gray, and grayish-brown to dark-gray beds of sheet sandstone, plus some beds of conglomerate and conglomeratic sandstone; sparse mudstone beds as well. The crossbedded sandstones are generally thin bedded to massive, and commonly thick bedded. Beds alternate irregularly to form steep, steplike slopes. Ranges in thickness from 9 to 75 m (30–250 ft). Fluvial in origin. This unit is equivalent, in part, to the Tuscher and Farrer Formations of the eastern Book Cliffs.

Fossil pollen (palynomorphs) indicate a late Campanian (Late Cretaceous) age .

See also

 List of fossiliferous stratigraphic units in Utah
 Paleontology in Utah

References

 

Cretaceous geology of Utah